Rucker Taylor is an American college baseball coach, currently serving as head coach of the Davidson Wildcats baseball team. Taylor played baseball for the Vanderbilt Commodores baseball team while obtaining a degree. He achieved his master's degree while coaching for the Samford Bulldogs baseball team.

Coaching career
Taylor began coaching as a graduate assistant for the Samford Bulldogs baseball team in 2007.

On August 1, 2012, Taylor joined Dick Cooke's coaching staff with the Davidson Wildcats baseball team. Taylor served as the major catalyst for turning Davidson into a winning program, as they have finished with a winning record in 5 of his 6 seasons as coach.

In February, 2018, Taylor was named the successor to Cooke beginning the 2019 season.

Head coaching record

See also
 List of current NCAA Division I baseball coaches

References

External links
Davidson Wildcats bio

Living people
1984 births
Vanderbilt Commodores baseball players
Samford Bulldogs baseball coaches
Davidson Wildcats baseball coaches
Samford University alumni